Hanover Township is the name of some places in the U.S. state of Pennsylvania:

 Hanover Township, Beaver County, Pennsylvania
 Hanover Township, Lehigh County, Pennsylvania
 Hanover Township, Luzerne County, Pennsylvania
 Hanover Township, Northampton County, Pennsylvania
 Hanover Township, Washington County, Pennsylvania

See also 
 East Hanover Township, Pennsylvania (disambiguation)
 New Hanover Township, Pennsylvania
 South Hanover Township, Pennsylvania
 Upper Hanover Township, Pennsylvania
 West Hanover Township, Pennsylvania
 Hanover, Pennsylvania

Pennsylvania township disambiguation pages